Olkhovatka is an urban locality (an urban-type settlement) in Olkhovatsky District of Voronezh Oblast, Russia. Population:

References

Urban-type settlements in Voronezh Oblast
Populated places in Olkhovatsky District